Rattus Norvegicus (alternative title The Stranglers IV) is the debut studio album by the Stranglers, released on 15 April 1977.

It was one of the highest-selling albums of the punk era in Britain, eventually achieving platinum record sales. Two of its tracks, "Peaches" and "(Get A) Grip (On Yourself)", were released as 7-inch singles in the UK.

Background 
The album was originally going to be titled Dead on Arrival but it was changed at the last minute. The Stranglers IV prefix was a deliberate attempt by the band to cause confusion. The released title is the taxonomic name for the common brown rat. The album was produced in one week by Martin Rushent and was a snapshot of the band's live set at the time.

The first 10,000 copies of the original vinyl release included a free 7-inch single, containing "Peasant in the Big Shitty" (live) and "Choosey Susie". The album launch party was held in the Water Rat pub on the King's Road, in the World's End district of Chelsea.

Remastered versions of the album were reissued on CD in 1996, 2001 and 2018, and included additional tracks.

Lyrics 
According to the book The Stranglers-Song by Song, "Sometimes" describes a violent argument with a girlfriend. The same girlfriend is the subject of "Strange Little Girl" which was written earlier by Cornwell and Hans Wärmling. "Goodbye Toulouse" describes the destruction of Toulouse predicted by Nostradamus.

"London Lady" is loosely based on a contemporary female journalist, and "Hanging Around" describes the characters found in the London pubs where the band performed. In 1981, it was covered by Hazel O'Connor on her third album, Cover Plus, and released by her as a single that same year.

"(Get a) Grip (On Yourself)" is based on the band's life in their Chiddingfold squat. It features Eric Clarke, a Welsh coal miner friend of the band's manager Dai Davies, on saxophone. "Ugly" mentions the poem Ozymandias.

"Down in the Sewer" has four sections: "Falling", "Down in the Sewer", "Trying to Get Out Again", and "Rat's Rally". The 'sewer' refers to London. Lyrically the song references an episode of the 1975 post-apocalyptic BBC TV drama Survivors titled "Lights of London", where the protagonists leave the safety of a farming community to head for the city, which they find can only be entered through a rat-infested sewer.

Reception and legacy

Rattus Norvegicus was ranked at No. 10 among the top albums of the year for 1977 by NME, with "Peaches" ranked at No. 18 among the year's top tracks. NME later ranked it at No. 196 on its 2014 list of the 500 greatest albums of all time. In 2000, Rattus Norvegicus was voted number 766 in Colin Larkin's All Time Top 1000 Albums. It was also included in Robert Dimery's 1001 Albums You Must Hear Before You Die.

During promotion of The Head on the Door in 1985, Robert Smith of the Cure cited Rattus Norvegicus as one of his five favourite albums.

Track listing 

Free single

1996 CD reissue bonus disc (EMI)
Disc one as per original album 

  
2001 CD bonus tracks

2018 CD reissue bonus tracks (Parlophone)

 Live at The Nashville pub in West Kensington, 10 Dec 1976

Charts and certifications

Weekly charts

Year-end charts

Singles

Personnel 
Credits adapted from the album liner notes.

The Stranglers
 Hugh Cornwell – guitars, lead and backing vocals
 Jean-Jacques Burnel – bass guitar, lead and backing vocals
 Dave Greenfield – keyboards (Hammond L100 Organ, Hohner Cembalet electric piano, Minimoog synthesizer), backing and lead vocals
 Jet Black – drums, percussion

Additional musicians
 Eric Clarke – tenor saxophone ("(Get A) Grip (On Yourself)")

Technical
 Martin Rushent – production
 Alan Winstanley – engineering
 Doug Bennett – mixing engineering 
 Benny King – mixing engineering assistance
 Vic Maile (with the Island Mobile) – engineering ("Peasant in the Big Shitty")
 Barry Cooder – remixing ("Grip '89") 
 Taff B. Dylan – remixing ("Grip '89")
 Trevor Rogers – sleeve photography
 Paul Henry – sleeve design, art direction

References

Bibliography

External links 
 
 Stranglers early success: the making of Rattus Norvegicus/No More Heroes; interviews with J.J. Burnel and Jet Black plus publicist Alan Edwards, producer Martin Rushent, music writers Chas de Whalley and Barry Cain

The Stranglers albums
Albums produced by Martin Rushent
1977 debut albums
United Artists Records albums
A&M Records albums
Art punk albums